Mark Nightingale (born 1 February 1957) is an English footballer who played in the Football League for Bournemouth, Norwich City and Peterborough United. He played as Bournemouth won the inaugural Associate Members' Cup by beating Hull City in the final.

References

English footballers
English Football League players
1957 births
Living people
AFC Bournemouth players
Crystal Palace F.C. players
Norwich City F.C. players
Bulova SA players
Peterborough United F.C. players
Kettering Town F.C. players
Association football defenders